Kai Widdrington (born 23 August 1995) is an English dancer and choreographer. In 2010, he was the Junior World Latin American champion. In 2012, he reached the final of the sixth series of Britain's Got Talent. Between 2017 and 2020, he was a professional dancer on the Irish version of Dancing with the Stars, and in 2021, he became a professional dancer on the BBC show Strictly Come Dancing.

Early life 
Widdrington was born in Southampton, England and grew up in Chandler's Ford, Eastleigh. His father is former Premier League footballer Tommy Widdrington, and his younger brother, Theo, currently plays for King's Lynn Town F.C. Widdrington was also set to follow in his father's footsteps by becoming a professional footballer, but aged 12 chose a dancing career instead of a Premier League contract. By the time he was 14, he was the World Junior Latin American champion.

Widdrington is of part Chinese descent. His maternal grandfather is Chinese and is said to have attended school with Bruce Lee.

Career

Britain's Got Talent 
In 2012, Widdrington formed a dance partnership with Natalia Jeved, both of whom auditioned for the sixth series of Britain's Got Talent. The pair managed to reach the live final, but finished in 11th place overall in the competition. Two years later, in 2014, Widdrington made a second appearance on the programme during its eighth series, as part of the ballroom dance group Kings & Queens, working alongside future Strictly Come Dancing professionals Katya Jones and Neil Jones, and future Dancing with the Stars professionals Ksenia Zsikhotska and Ryan McShane. The group managed to reach the semi-finals of the series, but were ultimately eliminated from the competition by that stage.

Dancing with the Stars 
In 2017, Widdrington was announced as one of the professional dancers for the first series of Dancing with the Stars in Ireland. He was partnered with comedian and actress Katherine Lynch. They were eliminated in week nine of the competition, finishing in sixth place.

In 2018, Widdrington was partnered with camogie player Anna Geary. They reached the final of the show, finishing as joint-runners up alongside Deirdre O'Kane and John Nolan.

In 2019, Widdrington was partnered with teenage actress Demi Isaac Oviawe. They were eliminated in week seven of the competition, finishing in eighth place.

In 2020, Widdrington was paired with Miss Universe Ireland 2018, Gráinne Gallanagh. On 15 March 2020, it was announced that the scheduled semi-final had become the final due to precautions around the COVID-19 pandemic halting production early. Gallanagh and Widdrington were one of the four couples in the final, and they finished as runners-up to winners Lottie Ryan and Pasquale La Rocca.

Highest and Lowest Scoring Per Dance

1 This score was awarded during Switch-Up Week.

Series 1 – with celebrity partner Katherine Lynch

Series 2 – with celebrity partner Anna Geary

Series 3 – with celebrity partner Demi Isaac Oviawe

Series 4 – with celebrity partner Gráinne Gallanagh

Strictly Come Dancing 
From September 2021, he appeared as a professional dancer on the nineteenth series of Strictly Come Dancing, partnered with television presenter AJ Odudu. In their first week the couple topped the leaderboard with a score of 34 for their jive to Gold Dust by DJ Fresh. Judge Motsi Mabuse hailed the routine "the best dance of the evening, without a doubt." The couple qualified for the final but had to withdraw the day before after Odudu suffered an ankle injury.

For the twentieth series, Widdrington was partnered with Loose Women panellist, Kaye Adams. They were the first couple to be eliminated from the series after losing the first dance off to Matt Goss and Nadiya Bychkova. On 30 November 2022, it was announced he would dance with Alexandra Mardell for the 2022 Strictly Christmas Special; they eventually won the competition with a perfect score on their quickstep.

Series 19 – with celebrity partner AJ Odudu

 number indicates when AJ & Kai were at the top of the leaderboard.
 number indicates when AJ & Kai were at the bottom of the leaderboard.
 *Score awarded by guest judge Cynthia Erivo.

Series 20 – with celebrity partner Kaye Adams

 number indicates when Kaye & Kai were at the bottom of the leaderboard.

Personal life 
From 2016 to 2021, Widdrington was in a relationship with professional dancer and fellow Dancing with the Stars professional, Giulia Dotta. In June of 2022, it was reported that he is in a relationship with fellow Strictly professional dancer, Nadiya Bychkova.

Dance tours 
In November 2022, Widdrington and Nadiya Bychkova  announced they were to appear at "Dancing With The Stars Weekends" 2023.

References 

1995 births
Living people
Britain's Got Talent contestants
British ballroom dancers
People from Southampton
English people of Chinese descent